Frank Baker may refer to:

Sport
Frank Baker or Home Run Baker (1886–1963), American baseball player
Frank Baker (cricketer) (1887–1961), Irish cricketer
Frank Baker (American football) (1909–1985), American football player
Frank Baker (footballer) (1918–1989), English soccer player
Frank Baker (shortstop) (born 1946), American baseball player 
Frank Baker (outfielder) (1944–2010), American baseball player
Frank Baker (ice hockey) (1884–1959), Canadian ice hockey player

Politics
Frank D. Baker (1852–1927), American politician in Michigan
Frank E. Baker (politician) (died 1957), American politician
Francis Patrick Baker (1873–1959), member of the Australian House of Representatives
Francis Matthew John Baker (1903–1939), member of the Australian House of Representatives
Frank R. Baker (1861–1952), American politician in the state of Washington
Frank Baker (Boston politician), member of the Boston City Council

Other
Frank Baker (actor) (1892–1980), Australian western actor of the Silent era
Frank Baker (writer) (1908–1982), English author, actor, musician and television scriptwriter
Frank Baker (diplomat) (born 1961), British ambassador 
Frank Baker (physician) (1841–1918), American physician
Frank Baker (1922–1989), Vancouver alderman and owner of The Attic restaurant

See also
Francis Baker (disambiguation)
B. Frank Baker (1864–1939), American businessman and politician
Franklin Baker (1872–1946), American flour miller